Treason was a heavy rock/metal trio based in London, England. Treason first began playing nationwide around the UK, supporting numerous home-grown and American acts. Early recordings included their LP, A Taste of Armageddon. The band then began recording their debut album in January 1990. After some internal conflict and difficulties with the recordings, however, three of the five members quit the band shortly after.

Treason's remaining two members sourced new members, in which later it was renamed to ‘Ashes to Ashes’. However, the three new members left the band as well. 

In 2009, the band was re-formed by vocalist John Seaton with new members. The band was signed to Casket Records after a year of touring. The new line up had their first official album release in late 2010. There were two contributing factors, however, that led to the album's obscurity; no promotion from the record company, and the band being unable to perform throughout the year due to personal problems.

History

Beginnings 
Treason's origins date back to 1988 when vocalist John Seaton, formerly of underground metal act ‘Apocalypse’  answered an advert from the first fledgling line-up. The music being written at that time was in the thrash metal mode, a style that was very much in vogue at the time. This first line-up went through the inevitable personnel changes before stabilizing somewhat with the addition of ex Apocalypse drummer Gary Brown and Italian bassist Fabrice Francese. The band then embarked on another touring schedule, playing nationwide and securing a sizeable following on the then burgeoning metal club circuit around the UK. They supported and toured with the likes of home-grown acts Venom, Paul Di Anno, Xentrix, Slammer and Onslaught, as well as visiting American names such as Bad Brains, Gwar and Warrior Soul, and for a while were among the leading lights of the underground thrash metal scene.

Early recordings 
The group recorded a track ‘Path Of No Return’ for a compilation album entitled ‘A Taste Of Armageddon’ – an LP featuring unsigned, underground UK metal acts and released by Master Records, a company run by Doug Trendle, AKA Buster Bloodvessel of British Ska/Two-Tone act, Bad Manners. This album has since become a collector's item. More personnel changes then occurred resulting in the addition of another ex-Apocalypse member, James Bravo, being drafted in on Guitar.
Treason were then offered a deal with Master Records and the band began recording their debut album in January 1990. Ex Thin Lizzy producer Nick Tauber was brought in, but the recording itself was plagued with difficulties and the result was not to anybody's liking. Said John Seaton ‘ Nick Tauber was a great guy and I loved his work with Lizzy; but in all honesty I don’t think he really knew what to do with us or had any interest in what we were doing musically. Consequently the album ended up sounding a desperately weak and confused mess, with weedy guitars and horrible 80’s drum soundS'
Opinions on the albums merits were superfluous anyway in the end as shortly after recording was completed Master records went bust, ensuring that the album never made it to the pressing stage. The band then went into meltdown with three of the five members quitting, Leaving only Seaton and original guitarist Jon Hutter onboard
The two then went about searching for a new line-up and in early 1991 found Martin Bourne (guitar), Rob Lewis (drums) and Julian McBride (bass) – happy at securing what they considered their best line-up yet Treason began anew and again started touring the country. After a while of doing so the band figured that a new name might be an idea to go along with the new line-up and so ‘Treason’ was dropped in favour of ‘Ashes to Ashes’ - The group recorded a couple of demos and touted them around the industry to no avail. Morale began to dip within the ranks after a year or so of getting nowhere and this culminated in a support slot the band played on a rainy Tuesday night in Norwich with a new American band called Neurosis – an act who were at the forefront of the new industrial metal scene coming through at that time. Seaton said later that Neurosis ‘wiped the floor with us’ and the group were left feeling sufficiently beaten and downhearted by the whole business that it prompted the three new members to quit. Again this left Seaton and Hutter as the only surviving members and at that time they too decided to throw the towel in. Bourne, Lewis and McBride then formed ‘Pulkas’ and secured a deal with Earache records. Pulkas became quite highly regarded for a while before they too disbanded some time afterwards.

After the split 
After the band finally split up Seaton kept out of the metal scene for a time spending the next 10 years or so instead focusing his attention on writing and recording his own solo music which was more in an acoustic/folk vein. However, the metal bug kept biting and in 2001 he recorded a self-financed album entitled Ego Prime, featuring material he had written during the ten-year hiatus from Treason.  Sufficiently inspired by the material (which was even reviewed favourably in Classic Rock magazine) John decided to put a band together to front the songs. He managed to secure the services of Harvey Bainbridge (ex-Hawkwind) on keyboards and John Bootle (ex-Stray) on bass guitar. John immediately took the band into the studio and self-financed another album re-recording all the songs that appeared on the Ego Prime demo. The resulting album, entitled Ego Prime was self-released in 2005 but Seaton was very unhappy with the results. ‘I basically ran out of money and just couldn’t get it sounding how I wanted it to in time’ he said. This group only performed live twice, once at the ‘Sonic Rock’ festival in Skegness, where they played alongside Space Ritual and Arthur Brown, before Seaton folded the project in 2006

Treason 2009–2011 
Despite the failure of earlier album demos John Seaton, re-formed Treason with new members as past members were unable to be located, and Jon Hutter did not want to take part.  Treason were now working along the power trio lines rather than the traditional metal 5-piece.  In 2009 the line-up included Treason bassist Steve Reddihough, formerly of cult punk tock ‘n’ roll band The Machines, grunge metal band Lost Gravity, Ian Hunter’s daughter’s band The Tracie Hunter Band, and drummer Danny Rowe.  They returned to performing music on the gig circuit in the UK and were later signed to Casket Records after a year of touring  The band then began recording their first official album release in late 2010.  This album, entitled Lambs To The Slaughter''' was released in 2011.  However, the lack of album promoting and personal problems which prevented the band from performing at gigs, led to the album’s obscurity.  

 2012 and beyond 
Drummer Toby Wyss joined in 2012. Toby, a student of the British drum teacher/virtuoso Pete Riley, brought fresh impetus to the band and, sufficiently re-juvenated, they decided to re-record the drums and guitars on the 2009 demo and release it as their follow up album to Lambs To The Slaughter. This album, entitled Hell Is A Place On Earth was released May 2012. However the band folded again shortly afterward for the last time

Members
 John Seaton - vocals, guitar
 Steve Reddihough - bass
 Toby Wyss - drums
 Danny Rowe - drums
 Gary Brown - drums
 Rob lewis - drums
 Fabrice Francese - Bass
 Julian McBride - Bass
 Jon Hutter - guitar
 Cullen Reavley - guitar
 Martin Bourne - guitar
 James Bravo - guitar

Discography
Compilation albums
 A Taste of Armageddon'' (1989)

References

English heavy metal musical groups
Musical groups from London